The W. H. Allen House is a historic house in rural Columbia County, Arkansas. It is a single-story house whose main block is a four-room dogtrot house built in 1873 by one of the area's first American settlers, Walter Howard Allen. The house was enlarged by Allen's son in 1907, and has been little altered since. The road it is located on (County Road 40) was once the main road between Magnolia and El Dorado.

The house was listed on the National Register of Historic Places on October 14, 1976.

See also
National Register of Historic Places listings in Columbia County, Arkansas

References

Houses on the National Register of Historic Places in Arkansas
Houses completed in 1873
Houses in Columbia County, Arkansas
National Register of Historic Places in Columbia County, Arkansas
Dogtrot architecture in Arkansas
1873 establishments in Arkansas